Shew is a surname. Notable people with the surname include:

 Bobby Shew (born 1941), American jazz trumpeter
 Joel Shew (1816–1855), American physician, hydrotherapist, and natural hygiene advocate
 William Shew (1820–1903), American photographer
 Etienne Shew-Atjon (born 1974), Dutch footballer